In experimental fluid mechanics, Lagrangian Particle Tracking refers to the process of determining trajectories of small neutrally buoyant particles (flow tracers) that are freely suspended within a turbulent flow field. These are usually obtained by 3-D Particle Tracking Velocimetry. A collection of such particle trajectories can be used for analyzing the Lagrangian dynamics of the fluid motion, for performing Lagrangian statistics of various flow quantities etc.

In computational fluid dynamics, the Lagrangian particle tracking (or in short LPT method) is a numerical technique for simulated tracking of particle paths Lagrangian within an Eulerian phase. It is also commonly referred to as Discrete Particle Simulation (DPS). Some simulation cases for which this method is applicable are: sprays, small bubbles, dust particles, and is especially optimal for dilute multiphase flows with large Stokes number.

See also
Lagrangian and Eulerian specification of the flow field

References

fluid dynamics